Digipedi (디지페디, short for Digital Pedicure) is a South Korean video production company formed and led by art director duo Seong Won-mo and Park Sang-woo (The latter already left the company). Based in Seoul, the studio specializes in the production of music videos, commercial films and visual art.

Videography

Music videos

2007
 Dynamic Duo - "Complex"

2008
 Bizniz - "So Sick"
 Buga Kingz - "Siren"
 Clazziquai Project - "Beat in Love"
 Clazziquai Project - "Flea"
 Clazziquai Project - "Love Again"
 My Aunt Mary - "Blue Tinware Scooter"
 Shin Seung-hun - "Turn on the Radio"
 Untouchable feat. Song Jieun - "Give You Everything"
 W & Whale - "R.P.G Shine"

2009
 Jo Kwon & Whale - "Dunk Shoot"
 Lee Seung-hwan - "Good Day 2"
 Loveholics feat. Shin Min-a - "Miracle Blue"
 MC Sniper & Outsider feat. Horan - "Heart Disease"
 Smoky J - "Player"
 W & Whale - "High School Sensation"

2010
 Double K - "Favorite Music"
 Lee Juck - "With You"
 Soul Dive & FPM - "L.I.E (Love Is Everywhere)"
 YB & RRM - "Sneakers"

2011
 Kim Hyung-jun - "Oh! Ah!"
 Kim Yeo-hee - "Half"
 Eluphant - "Kidult"
 Re:Plus - "Let the Story Tell"
 Re:Plus - "New Age of Beats"
 Rude Paper - "Radio"
 Soul Dive - "Bad Habit"
 Thomas Cook - "I Am Nothing at All"
 W & Whale - "Break It Down"

2012
 Baechigi - "Two Mari"
 Buga Kingz - "Don't Go"
 Busker Busker - "Cherry Blossom Ending"
 Clazzi feat. Yi Sung-yol - "Love & Hate"
 Fresh Boyz feat. G.NA - "KingKong Shower"
 Hello Venus - "What Are You Doing Today?"
 Kero One feat. Esna - "Fast Life"
 Orange Caramel - "Lipstick"
 John Park - "Falling"
 Primary feat. Zion.T & Gaeko - "See Through"
 Seo In-young - "Anymore"
 Seo In-young - "Let's Dance"

2013
 A-Jax - "Insane"
 A-Jax - "Snake"
 Andamiro - "Waiting"
 B1A4 - "What's Happening"
 Cheeze - "Mango"
 Dirty Radio - "Lost at Sea"
 Double K feat. Michelle Lee - "Rewind"
 Icon - "Rockstar"
 IU - "Monday Afternoon"
 Jinbo - "Be My Friend"
 Jinbo - "Cops Come Knock"
 Jinbo - "Fantasy"
 Kero One - "In All the Wrong Places"
 KK - "Boys Be..."
 Ladies' Code - "Hate You"
 Ladies' Code - "Pretty Pretty"
 Lim Kim feat. Swings - "Voice"
 Lim Kim - "Goodbye 20"
 Loco feat. Narae of Spica - "Take Care"
 LUSH - "Miserable"
 John Park - "Baby"
 SHINee - "Dream Girl"
 Shin Seung-hun - "Sorry"
 Soyou & Mad Clown - "Stupid in Love"
 Swings - "A Real Lady"
 Swings feat. Seo In-guk - "Would You?"
 Zion.T feat. Gaeko - "Babay"

2014
 Apink - "Mr. Chu"
 Beenzino - "How Do I Look"
 Boys Republic - "Video Game"
 Cherry Filter - "Andromeda"
 Crucial Star feat. Sojin of Girl's Day - "Three Things I Want to Give to You"
 Epik High - "Born Hater"
 EXID - "Up & Down"
 Fiestar - "One More"
 Jun. K - "Love & Hate"
  Jun. K - "No Love"
 Kim Yeon-woo feat. Kyung of Block B - "Move"
 Ladies' Code - "Kiss Kiss"
 Lee Min-woo - "Taxi"
 Loco feat. Jay Park - "Thinking About You"
 Lovelyz - "Candy Jelly Love"
 Lovelyz - "Good Night Like Yesterday"
 Masta Wu feat. Dok2, Bobby - "Come Here"
 Orange Caramel - "Catallena"
 Orange Caramel - "The Gangnam Avenue"
 Orange Caramel - "My Copycat"
 John Park - "U"
 Lena Park feat. Verbal Jint - "Sweet" (Brand New Mix)
 Rainbow Blaxx - "Cha Cha"
 Seo In-guk - "Bomtanaba"
 Topp Dogg - "Annie"
 Wax - "Fly High"
 Wax - "Just Leave"
 Wings - "Hair Short"
 Yoon Hyun-sang with IU - "When Would It Be"

2015
 Andy - "Puppy Love"
 April - "Dream Candy"
 Beenzino - "Break"
 Big Bang - "We Like 2 Party"
 Davink - "Love Again"
 EXID - "Hot Pink"
 Giriboy feat. Shin Jisu - "Back and Forth 30 min"
 Infinite - "Bad"
 Jinusean feat. Jang Hanna - "Tell Me One More Time"
 Kara - "Cupid"
 Kim Jang-hoon - "What are you?"
 Lee Juck - "Arguement"
 Lim Kim - "Awoo"
 Lizzy - "Not an Easy Girl"
 Lovelyz - "Ah-Choo"
 Lovelyz - "For You"
 Lovelyz - "Hi~"
 Lovelyz - "Shooting Star"
 Mamamoo - "Ahh Oop!"
 Norazo - "Ni Paljaya"
 Primary feat. Lena Park - "Hello"
 Primary feat. Beenzino, Suran - "Mannequin"
 Psy feat. CL of 2NE1 - "Daddy"
 Psy - "Napal Baji"
 San E feat. Baek Ye-rin of 15& - "Me You"
 Seventeen & Ailee - "Q&A"
 Stellar - "Vibrato"
 Zion.T - "Eat"

2016
 Beenzino - "Life in Color"
 CocoSori - "Dark Circle"
 Giriboy feat. Brother Su - "Hogu"
 Hanhae feat. Jung Eun-ji - "Eyescream"
 Heize feat. Dean - "Shut Up & Groove"
 Heize feat. Dean & DJ Friz - "And July"
 Heize - "Star"
 I.O.I - "Very Very Very"
 J.Y. Park feat. Conan O'Brien, Steven Yeun & Jimin Park - "Fire"
 Ladies' Code - "The Rain"
 Lee Hi - "My Star"
 Loona/HyunJin - "Around You"
 Loona/HaSeul - "Let Me In"
 Loona/HeeJin, HyunJin, HaSeul - "The Carol"
 Lovelyz - "Destiny"
 MC Gree - "Dangerous"
 Mixx - "Oh Ma Mind"
 Oh My Girl - "Liar Liar"
 Oh My Girl - "Windy Day"
 Pia - "SHINE"
 Rainbow - "Whoo"
 San E & Raina - "Sugar and Me"
 Seventeen - "Very Nice"
 Stellar - "Sting"
 Stellar - "Crying"
 Winner - "Sentimental"
 Xia feat. The Quiett, Automatic - "Rock the World"
 Zico - "I Am You, You Are Me"

2017
Dreamcatcher - "Chase Me"
 Dreamcatcher - "Good Night"
Eddy Kim - "Heart Pound"
EXID - "DDD"
Girl's Day - "I'll Be Yours"
Gugudan - "A Girl Like Me"
Gugudan - "Chococo"
Heize - "Don't Know You"
Jun. K - "No Shadow"
Loona 1/3 - "Love & Live"
Loona 1/3 - "Sonatine"
 Loona/Choerry - "Love Cherry Motion" 
 Loona/Chuu - "Heart Attack"
 Loona/JinSoul - "Singing in the Rain" 
 Loona/Kim Lip - "Eclipse"
 Loona Odd Eye Circle - "Girl Front"
 Loona Odd Eye Circle - "Sweet Crazy Love"
 Loona/ViVi - "Everyday I Love You (Feat. HaSeul)" 
 Loona/YeoJin - "Kiss Later"
 Loona/Yves - "new"
Lovelyz - "Now, We"
 Lovelyz - "WoW!"
MXM - "I'M THE ONE"
N.Flying - "The Real"
Yang Hee-eun, Akdong Musician - "The Tree"
Yesung - "Paper Umbrella" 
Yozoh - "Let It Shine"

2018
BoA - "One Shot, Two Shot"
DAVII - "Only Me (Feat. Heize)"
Day6 - "If"
Day6 - "Stop The Rain"
Day6 - "Breaking Down"
Chansung - "Treasure"
Fromis 9 - "To Heart"
Fromis 9 - "DKDK"
Fromis 9 - "Love Bomb"
 Got7 - "I Won't Let You Go"
GyeongRee of 9MUSES - "Blue Moon"
Heize - "Jenga"
Heize - "MIANHAE"
Loona/Go Won - "One&Only" 
Loona/Olivia Hye - "Egoist (Feat. JinSoul)"
Loona/yyxy - "love4eva (Feat. Grimes)"
Loona - "Favorite"
Loona - "Hi High"
MXM - "Diamond Girl"
Nichkhun - "Lucky Charm"
Pentagon - "Naughty Boy"
Rothy - "Lost Time"
Seventeen - "Call Call Call"
SFC.JGR - "Stairway"
Wanna One - "I.P.U"

2019
AB6IX - "Hollywood"
AB6IX - "Breathe"
AB6IX - "Blind For Love"
fromis_9 - "Fun!"
(G)I-DLE - "Uh-Oh"
(G)I-DLE - "Lion"
Got7 - "Love Loop"
Heize - "We Don't Talk Together"
Iz*One - "Violeta"
Loona - "Butterfly"
Rothy - "Bee"
Ruann - "Beep Beep"
Tomorrow x Together - "Magic Island"
Tomorrow x Together - "Nap of a Star"
VERIVERY - "Tag Tag Tag"
Yukika - "Neon"
Yukika - "Cherries Jubiles"

2020
ATEEZ - "INCEPTION"
Lee Jin Hyuk - "Bedlam"
Loona - "So What"
Loona - "Why Not?"
 P1Harmony - "Siren"
Seventeen - "Left & Right"
Seventeen - "Home;Run"
SF9 - "Good Guy"
SF9 - "Summer Breeze"
Tomorrow x Together - "Eternally"
Han Seung-woo - "Sacrifice" 
VERIVERY - "Lay Back"
VERIVERY - "Thunder"
Yukika - "Yesterday"
Yukika - "Soul Lady"

2021
 Epik High - "Rosario (ft. CL, ZICO)"
Tomorrow X Together - "Blue Hour (Japanese Ver)"
 Pentagon - "Do or Not"
 P1Harmony - "Scared"
 Heize - "Happen"
 Loona - "PTT (Paint the Town)"
 SF9 - "Tear Drop"
 Enhypen - "Given-Taken (Japanese Ver)"
 Sunmi - "You Can't Sit with Us"
Lee Hi - "Red Lipstick (Feat. Yoon Mirae)"
Loona - "Hula Hoop"
 INI - "Rocketeer"
Tomorrow X Together - "0X1=LOVESONG (I Know I Love You) feat. Ikuta Lilas [Japanese Ver.]"
Ateez - "야간비행 (Turbulence)"
Ateez - "멋 (The Real) (흥 : 興 Ver.)"

2022
Nmixx - "O.O"
Enhypen - "Tamed-Dashed [Japanese Ver.]"
&AUDITION - The Howling - "The Final Countdown"
Ateez - "Guerrilla"
&TEAM - "Under the Skin"
P1Harmony - "Backdown"
&TEAM - "Under the Skin (Extended ver.)"

Commercial films

2007
 CJ E&M - KMTV Rating
 CJ E&M - KMTV Signal: It's Poppin' featuring E-Sens

2008
 INNO Design - APELBAUM

2009
 G-Market - Media Pole
 G-Market - Theater Advertising
 HappyCong, CJ E&M - HappyCong Filler
 LG Electronics - LG Chocolate (BL40) Masters from the East

2010
 Daum Communications - Life On
 LG Electronics - LG Optimus One The Code
 LG Electronics - LG Optimus G Pro Adventures of Dr. Android
 Samsung Electronics - Crazy Academy (agency: Cheil Worldwide)
 Vans, CJ E&M - VANS X Mspriters Filler

2011
 Beats Electronics, CJ E&M - Beats by Dr. Dre 
 CJ E&M - Music X Live
 Puma SE - PUMA Fass 300

2012
 Beats Electronics, CJ E&M - Beats by Dr. Dre Viral

2013
 CJ E&M - tvN Cheongdam-dong 111 OAP Package
 LOEN Entertainment - History Debut Trailer
 Puma SE - B1A4 X PUMA How to PUMA Suede

2014
 CJ E&M - tvN Cheongdam-dong 111: N.Flying's Way of Becoming a Star OAP Package

Unknown
 BC Card - BC Card Web
 LG Telecom - Google Maps Service

Other

2022 
Dark Moon: Grey City with &TEAM Story Film

References

External links

South Korean music video directors